Cer, or CER may refer to:

Environment
 Certified Emission Reduction, emission units

Statistics
 Control event rate, a statistical value in epidemiology
 Crossover error rate, a statistical value in a biometric system

Information technology
 Canonical Encoding Rules, encoding format
 Customer edge router, in computer networking
 CER Computer (Serbian Latin: Cifarski Elektronski Računar, "Digital Electronic Computer"), series of early computers

Geography
 Cer (mountain), a mountain in Serbia
 Cer, Zvornik, a village in the municipality of Zvornik, Republika Srpska, Bosnia and Herzegovina
 Cer, Kičevo, a village in the municipality of Kičevo, North Macedonia
 Cherbourg – Maupertus Airport or Aéroport de Cherbourg - Maupertus, an airport in France by IATA airport code
 Chinese Eastern Railway (Chinese: 中東鐵路/中东铁路, also known as the Chinese Far East Railway), a railway in northeastern China

Religion
 Keres, Greek goddess of violent death, one of the Greek primordial deities

Medicine
 Comparative effectiveness research, comparison of health care intervention effectiveness
 Conditioned emotional response, a specific learned behavior or a procedure

Sports
 Classic Endurance Racing, a sports car racing series founded in 2004 by Peter Auto Ltd.

Organizations and trade agreements
 Conference of European Rabbis, rabbinical alliance in Europe
 Closer Economic Relations, a free trade agreement between Australia and New Zealand
 Commission for Energy Regulation, a Republic of Ireland energy regulator
 Community of European Railway and Infrastructure Companies, railway system

Broadcasting
 Astro Ceria Malaysian pay-channel 611

Publications
 Comparative Education Review, publication of the Comparative and International Education Society

Finance
 Currency exchange rate, rate at which one currency will be exchanged for another currency